The 2nd People's Defence Force (2 PDF) is a division of the Singapore Army responsible for maintaining peace within Singapore and carrying out mainly counter-terrorism and homeland security operations.

History
The 2nd People's Defence Force traces its origins to October 1965 when the People's Defence Force Headquarters (PDF HQ) was established as part of the Ministry of Interior and Defence and tasked with recruiting 3,200 volunteers to defend Singapore. In 1968, the PDF was reorganised to take on operational roles in maintaining internal security within Singapore.

After 9/11, HQ 2 PDF Command was reorganised to form the multi-agency Island Defence Headquarters (IDHQ) to protect Singapore against terrorism. They initiated operations to provide round-the-clock protection of key military and civilian installations around Singapore.

In 2010, the IDHQ became the Island Defence Task Force (IDTF) and the 1st Singapore Infantry Brigade (1 SIB) was created, taking command of the 6th, 8th and 9th Battalions, Singapore Infantry Regiment (SIR). The Military Police Command, Military Band and Gombak Base (Ministry of Defence headquarters) came under the 2nd People's Defence Force's command in 2011.

In 2015, the 2nd People's Defence Force introduced the Peacekeeper Protected Response Vehicle (PRV) to replace the V-200s previously used for island defence operations.

In July 2017, the Island Defence Training Institute (IDTI) was opened as a training centre for active and reservist units involved in Singapore's homeland security.

References 

Singapore Army
Formations of the Singapore Army
Military units and formations established in 1965